Juana Barraza (born 27 December 1957) is a Mexican serial killer and former professional wrestler dubbed La Mataviejitas (Sp. "The Little Old Lady Killer") sentenced to 759 years in prison for the killing of 16 elderly women. The first murder attributed to Mataviejitas has been dated variously to the late 1990s and to a specific killing on 17 November 2003. The authorities and the press have given various estimates as to the total number of the Mataviejitas victims, with estimates ranging from 42 to 48 deaths. After the arrest of Juana Barraza the case of the Mataviejitas was officially closed despite more than 30 unresolved cases. Araceli Vázquez and Mario Tablas were also arrested in 2005 and called by police and media The Mataviejitas.

Early life and family
Juana Barraza was born in Epazoyucan, Hidalgo, a rural area north of Mexico City. Barraza's mother, Justa Samperio, was an alcoholic who reportedly exchanged her for three beers to a man who repeatedly raped her in his care, and by whom she became pregnant with a son.  She had four children in total, although her eldest son died from injuries sustained in a mugging.  Prior to her arrest, Barraza was a professional wrestler under the ring name of La Dama del Silencio (The Lady of Silence).  She had a strong interest in lucha libre, a form of Mexican masked professional wrestling.

Profile
All of Barraza's victims were women aged 60 or over, many of whom lived alone. Barraza bludgeoned or strangled them before robbing them.

Bernardo Bátiz, the chief prosecutor in Mexico City, initially profiled the killer as having "a brilliant mind, [being] quite clever and careful," and suggested that the killer probably struck after gaining the trust of the intended victim. Investigating officers suspected that the killer posed as a government official, offering victims the chance to sign up for welfare programs.

The search for Barraza was complicated by conflicting evidence. At one point, the police hypothesized that two killers might be involved. An odd coincidence also distracted the investigation: at least three of Barraza's victims owned a print of an eighteenth-century painting by French artist Jean-Baptiste Greuze, Boy in A Red Waistcoat.

The authorities believed that Juana Barraza was a psychopath who felt no remorse. Furthermore, Barraza associated her elderly victims with her mother and believed that she was helping society by killing them. In order to gain the trust of her victims, Barraza posed as a government official who worked in social welfare. Because of this, Barraza is placed in the “care giving” category of female killers.

Investigation
The authorities were heavily criticised by the media for dismissing evidence that a serial killer was at work in Mexico City as merely "media sensationalism" as late as the summer of 2005. Soon after setting an investigation in motion, the police incurred further criticism by launching what one journalist described as a "ham-fisted" and unproductive swoop on Mexico City's transvestite prostitutes.

By November 2005, the Mexican authorities were reporting witness statements to the effect that the killer wore women's clothing to gain access to the victim's apartments. In one case, a large woman in a red blouse was seen leaving the home of a murdered woman. Two months later, police began checking the fingerprints of bodies in the city's morgues in the apparent belief that Mataviejitas might have committed suicide.

A major breakthrough in the case occurred on 25 January 2006, when a suspect was arrested fleeing from the home of the serial killer's latest victim, Ana María de los Reyes Alfaro, who lived in the Venustiano Carranza borough of Mexico City. Alfaro, 82, had been strangled with a stethoscope.

To the surprise of many Mexicans, who had supposed the killer to be male, the suspect detained was Juana Barraza, 48, a female wrestler known professionally as The Silent Lady. Witnesses at previous murder scenes had described a masculine-looking woman and police had previously looked for a transvestite although they later admitted that the former wrestler resembled composite images of the suspect.  Barraza closely resembled a model of the killer's features, which showed La Mataviejitas with close-cropped hair dyed blonde and a facial mole, and was carrying a stethoscope, pension forms, and a card identifying her as a social worker when she was detained.

Mexico City prosecutors said fingerprint evidence linked Barraza to at least 10 murders of the as many as 40 murders attributed to the killer. The wrestler is said to have confessed to murdering Alfaro and three other women, but denied involvement in all other killings. She told reporters she had visited Alfaro's home in search of laundry work.

Trial and verdict
Barraza was tried in the spring of 2008, the prosecution alleging she had been responsible for as many as 40 deaths. She admitted to one murder, that of Alfaro, and told the police her motive was lingering resentment regarding her own mother's treatment of her. On 31 March, she was found guilty on 16 charges of murder and aggravated burglary, including 11 separate counts of murder. She was sentenced to 759 years in prison. Since sentences imposed in Mexican courts are generally served concurrently, but the maximum sentence under Mexican law is 60 years, she will most likely serve the full sentence in prison.

Portrayal in media
She was first portrayed in a TV series called Mujer: Casos de la vida real in the early 2000s. Mexican producer Pedro Torres brought the story to television on an episode of the 2010 Mexican television series Mujeres Asesinas 3 that was produced by Televisa. The episode is called "Maggie, Pensionada" starring the Mexican actress Leticia Perdigón as Maggie and Irma Lozano, Ana Luisa Peluffo, and Lourdes Canale as victims.

Barraza was highlighted in the documentary Instinto Asesino which aired on Discovery en Español in 2010. The episode was entitled, "La Mataviejitas". Juana Barraza was also highlighted on the show La Historia Detras Del Mito, the episode was also entitled "La Mataviejitas".

In September 2015, Barraza was highlighted in the Investigation Discovery series Deadly Women, in an episode titled "Payback".

"Machismo", the nineteenth episode of the first season of Criminal Minds is partly based on Barraza.

Juana Barraza was featured on the 478th episode of The Last Podcast on the Left.

See also
List of serial killers by country
List of serial killers by number of victims

References

External links
Mexican Police satisfied with sentence on Cronica
Mexico police hunt serial killer on BBC News
Investiga PGJDF posible suicidio del 'Mataviejitas' on esmas.com
Mexico police captures serial killer "Mataviejitas"' on Terra
Woman held in Mexico killer hunt  BBC News website
Performing mexicanidad: criminality and lucha libre

1956 births
2006 in Mexico
20th-century Mexican criminals
20th-century Mexican women
21st-century Mexican criminals
21st-century Mexican women
Living people
Mexican female professional wrestlers
Mexican female serial killers
Mexican people convicted of murder
People convicted of burglary
People convicted of murder by Mexico
People from Pachuca
Professional wrestlers from Hidalgo (state)